The 10th Infantry Brigade was a formation of the Royal Hungarian Army that participated in the Axis invasion of Yugoslavia during World War II.

Organisation

Commanders

10th Infantry Brigade 

 Brigadier General Dezsö Füleky (23 Jan 1939 - ? July 1939)
 Colonel Frigyes Gyimessy (1 Aug 1939 - 1 Mar 1940)
 Brigadier General Ferenc Peterdy (1 Mar 1940 - 1 Oct 1941)
 Brigadier General Jenö Felkl (1 Oct 1941 - 17 Feb 1942)

10th Light Division 

 Brigadier General Jenö Felkl  (17 Feb 1943 - 1 May 1942)
 Colonel Belá Tanitó (1 May 1942 - ? Sep 1942)
 General László Molnár (? Sep 1942 - 10 Aug 1943)

10th Infantry Division 
 Brigadier General István Kudriczy (10 Aug 1943 - 15 June 1944)
 Brigadier General Kornél Oszlányi (15 June 1944 - 5 Dec 1944)
 Brigadier General József Kisfaludy (5 Dec 1944 - ? Dec 1944)
 Colonel Sándor András (? Dec 1944 - 12 Feb 1945)

Notes

References

 

Military units and formations of Hungary in World War II